Kidsgrove Urban District was an urban district in the county of Staffordshire. It was formed in 1894 with the civil parishes of Hardings Wood, Kidsgrove, Newchapel and Talke. It was abolished in 1974, by virtue of the Local Government Act 1972, when it was absorbed into the Borough of Newcastle-under-Lyme.

References
A Vision of Britain - Kidsgrove

Kidsgrove
History of Staffordshire
Local government in Staffordshire
Districts of England abolished by the Local Government Act 1972
Districts of England created by the Local Government Act 1894
Urban districts of England